Woodlands Bus Interchange (formerly Woodlands Regional Bus Interchange) is a bus interchange in Singapore. Located at Woodlands, the interchange is linked to Woodlands MRT station and adjacent to Causeway Point shopping mall. It is the largest and among the busiest bus interchange in Singapore. The interchange is also known as Woodlands Integrated Transport Hub.

History

Original interchange
In 1991, as part of efforts to improve connectivity in the area, the Singapore government announced plans to build a new bus interchange in Woodlands.

The bus interchange commenced operations in February 1996, replacing the previous Woodlands interchange near Woodlands Checkpoint, and the Marsiling bus terminal. Covering an area the size of three and a half football pitches and with 11 bus bays, Woodlands interchange featured an integrated taxi stand, and a bus parking area located away from the passenger concourse.

Integrated Transport Hub

Contract PT247 to carry out alteration works to upgrade the Woodlands Regional Bus Interchange to an air-conditioned one and constructing a link to the new Thomson–East Coast line (TEL)was awarded to CCECC Singapore Pte Ltd

On 12 March 2016, to facilitate upgrading of the interchange and construction of a new link to the MRT station, operations of all bus services serving Woodlands interchange were shifted to a temporary interchange beside Woodlands MRT station.

The upgraded bus interchange reopened on 13 June 2021, and incorporated a heritage gallery showcasing SMRT & Trans-Island bus history over the years. Due to insufficient parking spaces in the interchange, service 925/925M, 950, 961/961M & 965 remained at the temporary interchange. 
 
When a land Vaccinated Travel Lane (VTL-Land) between Singapore and Malaysia was announced, Berth B5 of the temporary bus interchange was used for the VTL-Land bus service operated by Transtar from 29 November 2021. The service was renamed to Vaccinated Travel Bus Service (VTBS) when the Singapore government scrapped all of her VTL schemes for the reopening of borders to all Vaccinated persons on 1 April 2022. VTBS ceased on 1 May 2022 as cross-border public bus services resumed.

Bus Contracting Model

Under the new bus contracting model, all the bus routes were split into 9 route packages operating from Woodlands Integrated Transport Hub Bus Interchange. Bus Services 169, 856, 858, 963, 963e, 966, 969 are under Sembawang-Yishun Bus Package, Bus Service 161 is under Sengkang-Hougang Bus Package, Bus Service 168 is under Bedok Bus Package and the rest of the bus services are under Woodlands Bus Package.

Currently, Bus Services 169, 856, 858, 963, 963e, 966, 969 (Sembawang-Yishun Bus Package) is operated by Tower Transit Singapore. Bus Service 161 (Sengkang-Hougang Bus Package) and Bus Service 168 (Bedok Bus Package) are currently operated by SBS Transit. All remaining bus services are operated by the anchor operator, SMRT Buses.

List of routes

Temporary Bus Interchange
Under the new bus contracting model, all the bus routes were split into 2 route packages operating from Woodlands Temporary Bus Interchange. Bus Service 965 is under Sembawang-Yishun Bus Package and the rest of the bus services are under Woodlands Bus Package.

Currently, Bus Service 965 (Sembawang-Yishun Bus Package) is operated by Tower Transit Singapore. All remaining bus services are operated by the anchor operator, SMRT Buses.

List of routes

References

External links
 Interchanges and Terminals (SBS Transit)
 Interchange/Terminal (SMRT Buses)
 Woodlands Town Map & Services Guide

2021 establishments in Singapore
Bus stations in Singapore
Woodlands, Singapore